Robert Gschwandner (19 December 1875, in Hernals, Vienna – 14 May 1927, in Vienna) was an Austrian entomologist.

He was a specialist in Saturniidae. Gschwandner was a friend of Hans Rebel then the Director of the Naturhistorisches Museum in Vienna. His collections were bequeathed to the museum.

References
Berger, J. F., 1927: Robert Gschwandner Zeitschrift d. Österr. Ent.-Ver. 12(6): 53-57.

External links
Zobodat

1875 births
1927 deaths
Austrian lepidopterists
Austro-Hungarian scientists